Pueblito is an unincorporated community and census-designated place in Rio Arriba County, New Mexico, United States. Its population was 91 as of the 2010 census. Pueblito was settled in the 1850s by former residents of La Parida, which was flooded by the Rio Grande.

Geography

Demographics

Education
It is in Española Public Schools. The comprehensive public high school is Española Valley High School.

References

Census-designated places in New Mexico
Census-designated places in Rio Arriba County, New Mexico